The proximal radioulnar articulation, also known as the proximal radioulnar joint (PRUJ), is a synovial pivot joint between the circumference of the head of the radius and the ring formed by the radial notch of the ulna and the annular ligament.

Structure 
The proximal radioulnar joint is a synovial pivot joint. It occurs between the circumference of the head of the radius and the ring formed by the radial notch of the ulna and the annular ligament. The interosseous membrane of the forearm and the annular ligament stabilise the joint.

A number of nerves run close to the proximal radioulnar joint, including:
median nerve
musculocutaneous nerve
radial nerve

See also
 Distal radioulnar articulation
 Supination

References 

Joints